Maud K. Jensen (1909- October 12, 1998) was a missionary and the first woman to receive full clergy rights in the Methodist Church in the United States.

Early life and education 
Maud Keister was from New Cumberland, Pennsylvania.

Jensen graduated from Bucknell University in Lewisburg, Pennsylvania in 1926. She was the first and only female to attend the school. Since this was not a popular decision to allow women in to study, Maud did not receive much welcome from her peers. She, as her own recorded oral history at Drew University reveals, decided that the only way to counter this was to best her classmates in every class. She did and graduated at the top of her class. She married Rev. Anders Kris Jensen, whom she met while they were both applying for the Korean missionary job in New York City, in 1928. She got the job, and their brief meeting made an impact. They corresponded until they became engaged and married. He joined her and her missionary work in South Korea. They had two children, Clair Lee and Phillip. Maud's husband, Kris, was taken as a civilian POW at the beginning of the Korean Conflict/War north of Seoul. He was held prisoner by North Korea for nearly 4 years. Maud and Kris later returned to continue their missionary work. Maud was twice honored by the South Korean government for her humanitarian works.

Career 
Jensen did missionary work in Korea for forty years. Jensen taught at the Methodist Theological Seminary in Korea.

She earned a Bachelor of Divinity degree from the Drew University Theological School in Madison, New Jersey in 1946. She applied to be ordained clergy in the Methodist New Jersey Conference but the Bishop would not approve her. A bishop in the Central Pennsylvania Conference approve her for local clergy ordination in 1952. When the Methodist Church voted to allow women to have full clergy rights in 1956, Jensen was given temporary full clergy rights for two years, and obtained permanent clergy status in 1958.

Later life 
Jensen received her doctorate from Drew Theological School at the age of 74. She died on October 12, 1998 in Madison, New Jersey.

References 

1909 births
1998 deaths
American Methodist missionaries
People from New Jersey
Female Christian missionaries
Bucknell University alumni
20th-century Methodists